Kédougou (Wolof: Keédugu) is a town in the Kédougou Region of south-eastern Senegal near the border with Mali and Guinea.

Founded in the early 20th century by the Malinké people, Kédougou means the "Land of Man". The town lies on the N7 road and the River Gambia amid the Pays Bassari hills and Fouta Djallon foothills.

Local attractions include the Dindefelo Falls and Niokolo-Koba National Park.  The main sources of income in the town are agriculture, small-scale commerce, construction, and gold mining.  There is a military camp, a hospital, a community radio station and library, a Peace Corps Office and a number of small businesses. The most commonly spoken languages are Pulaar, Bassari, Bedik, Diakhanké, Malinké and French.

In 2007, according to official estimates, Kédougou had a population of 18,860.

The mayor of Kédougou is Amath Dansokho (as of 2005).

Transport

A proposed railway branching off the existing line at Tambacounda would serve this town.

Mining
The gold-mining industry has brought several large-scale foreign mining companies to the Kédougou area.  This has been a source of tension with some local residents, who point to a lack of jobs available to locals.  In late 2008, protests over the practices of gold mines in the region turned violent.  On 23 December a protest march culminated in the burning of government buildings and the security forces firing on demonstrators.  The next several days saw widespread destruction of property, looting, and according to a Senegalese human rights group, the mass arrest and torture of suspects.  There were also reports that many residents fled the town, some as far as Guinea. Security forces reported one dead, 23 civilians and 10 gendarmes wounded.

Climate
Kédougou has a tropical savanna climate (Köppen Aw) featuring hot to sweltering, rainless winters and hot, rainy summers.

See also

 Transport in Senegal

References

External links 
 Peace Corps Senegal, Kedougou Page
 Friends of Peace Corps Kedougou

Regional capitals in Senegal
Populated places in Kédougou Region
Communes of Senegal